Jacaranda Records is an independent record label in Liverpool, United Kingdom, specialising in Immersive Audio.
 
Headquartered at The Jacaranda, the 1958 venue credited with launching The Beatles on their early careers, the label also operates live music venues and record stores across the city.

History 
Founded by former UMG Executive Vice President Ray Mia, in November 2018 the label announced plans to build a vinyl production press and recording studio in Liverpool, with construction of the company's first immersive audio facility beginning three months later.

In the summer of 2019, the label signed Spilt (band) and SHARDS on 10 year contracts. The label signed Aimée Steven at the end of that year.

Venues & Record Stores 
Jacaranda Records operates two live music venues and vinyl record stores in Liverpool, and was shortlisted for Music Week's Independent Retailer of The Year award in 2020.

The Jacaranda (21-23 Slater Street, Liverpool L1 4BW)

Originally opened by Allan Williams in 1958, The Jacaranda provided both rehearsal space and a stage for John Lennon, Paul McCartney, George Harrison & Stuart Sutcliffe to perform for the first time as The Silver Beetles. Re-furbished in 2014, the 60-year-old music hub still contains murals painted by Sutcliffe & Lennon and continues to operate as a bar, record shop and live music venue.

Jacaranda Phase One (40 Seel Street, Liverpool L1 4BE)
Opened to create a larger, 300-capacity pop-up live music venue in May 2018, Phase One also contains a cafe bar and vinyl records store with private listening booths.

Discography

References 

British independent record labels